Club Bangaz is the fifth album released by rap group, Partners-N-Crime. It was released on April 11, 2006, for UTP Records, Rap-A-Lot Records, Asylum Records, Atlantic Records and was produced by KLC, Mike Dean and J. Prince. Club Bangaz peaked at No. 88 on the Top R&B/Hip-Hop Albums chart in Billboard Magazine.

Track listing
"Intro"- 0:48  
"Club Bangaz"- 5:43 (feat. Juvenile)
"Poo Shooter"- 3:45 (feat. Juvenile)
"Ooh! Why?"- 2:44
"Inside The Club (Skit)"- 0:47
"Ohhh!"- 4:36
"Bubble Bubble"- 3:51 (feat. Juvenile & Skip)
"You Ain't Never"- 4:36 (feat. Skip & B-Shype)
"On The Block (Skit)"- 0:51
"Skee-Wee"- 3:57 (feat. L.O.D.)
"X & Sex"- 3:44
"Don't Hate Me"- 4:59 (feat. Skip & Lil' Flip)
"Get On Top"- 3:46 (feat. Ms. Tee)
"Do It Baby"- 5:26 (feat. Da Block Burnaz)
"My P-N-C"- 3:00
"Smoke Some'm"- 4:18 (feat. Bun B)
"Amari"- 0:33
"Love Jones'"- 3:25
"That's The Way"- 3:46 (feat. Tanya Herron)

2006 albums
Partners-N-Crime albums